The 1969–70 season was the 24th season in FK Partizan's existence. This article shows player statistics and matches that the club played during the 1969–70 season.

Players

Squad information

Friendlies

Competitions

Yugoslav First League

Yugoslav Cup

Inter-Cities Fairs Cup

First round

See also
 List of FK Partizan seasons

References

External links
 Official website
 Partizanopedia 1969-70  (in Serbian)

FK Partizan seasons
Partizan